Dactyloscopus amnis, the riverine stargazer, is a species of sand stargazer native to the Pacific coastal waters of Mexico where it is found in both marine and brackish water habitats.

References

amnis
Taxa named by Robert Rush Miller
Fish described in 1962